Scudder, a surname, may refer to:

People
 Bernard Scudder, translator from Icelandic to English
 Edward W. Scudder (1822-1893), Justice of the New Jersey Supreme Court
 Horace Scudder, American editor
 Henry Scudder (clergyman) (d. 1659?), English devotional writer
 Henry Martyn Scudder, American missionary and minister
 Ida S. Scudder, American missionary and physician
 Janet Scudder, American sculptor
 John Scudder, Sr., American medical missionary
 John Scudder (physician), American blood researcher
 John Milton Scudder, physician
 Laura Scudder, snack food developer
 Michael Y. Scudder, Circuit Judge of the United States Court of Appeals for the Seventh Circuit
 Richard Scudder,  publisher, Newark Evening News
 Samuel Hubbard Scudder (1837–1911), American entomologist and paleontologist
 Scott Scudder, American baseball player
 Scudders in India, 42 members of 4 generations of a family devoted to Christian service
 Thayer Scudder, American social anthropologist
 Vida Dutton Scudder, Indian-born American educator, writer, and welfare activist

Members of the United States Congress
Henry Joel Scudder, United States Representative from New York
Hubert Baxter Scudder, U.S. Representative from California
John Anderson Scudder, U.S. Representative from New Jersey
Nathaniel Scudder, physician and member of the Continental Congress
Isaac Williamson Scudder, U.S. Representative from New Jersey
Townsend Scudder, U.S. Representative from New York
Tredwell Scudder, U.S. Representative from New York
Zeno Scudder, U.S. Representative from Massachusetts

Fictional
 Alec Scudder, a character in Maurice (novel) and Maurice (film)
 Bertram Scudder, a character in Atlas Shrugged
 Franklin P. Scudder, a character found murdered in the book, The Thirty-Nine Steps by John Buchan
 Henry Scudder, a character in the HBO drama series Carnivàle
 Matthew Scudder, a fictional private detective
 Nehemiah Scudder, aka "The First Prophet", a background character in Robert A. Heinlein's Future History.

Scudder may also refer to:
DWS Scudder (formerly Scudder, Stevens & Clark), the asset management subsidiary of Deutsche Bank